Brian Singerman is a partner at Founders Fund, a San Francisco-based venture capital firm with over $11 billion under management.

Singerman graduated from Stanford University in 1999 with a B.S. in Computer Science. Following Stanford, Singerman joined the virtual-world online start-up, There, as a software engineer. In 2004, Singerman was recruited to Google. He spent the next four years at Google as an engineer and executive, where (among other projects) he founded the personal web portal, iGoogle.

While at Google, Singerman started his career as an investor, founding his own angel fund, the XGYC Fund, seeking early-stage opportunities with businesses that challenge the status quo.  In 2008, Singerman joined Founders Fund where he serves as a partner along with Peter Thiel and Ken Howery. Among other industries, he focuses on healthcare, biotech, wearable computing and robotics. Singerman is a board director for Affirm, AltSchool, Cloud9, Emerald Therapeutics, The Long-Term Stock Exchange, Oscar Health and Postmates, and a board observer for Airbnb, Forward and Wish.

In April 2016, Singerman's largest investment to date, Stemcentrx, was acquired by pharmaceutical company AbbVie in a transaction valuing the company at up to $10.2 billion. The acquisition was the largest portfolio exit in the history of Founders Fund. Stemcentrx was shuttered in 2019 when its cancer drug, Rova-T, failed to outperform placebo in a Phase 3 clinical trial.

References

American financial businesspeople
Singerman, Brian
Year of birth missing (living people)
Place of birth missing (living people)
Stanford University alumni
Businesspeople from the San Francisco Bay Area